George Northey may refer to:

 George Northey (footballer) (1883–?), footballer for Southampton
 George Northey (cricketer) (1835–1906), English cricketer and British Army officer